In Lust We Trust is the second album by Swedish glam rock band the Ark, released on 26 August 2002. Four singles were released from the album: "Calleth You, Cometh I", "Father of a Son", "Tell Me This Night Is Over" and "Disease".

Track listing
All songs written by Ola Salo, except where noted.

"Beauty Is the Beast" – 3:38
"Father of a Son" – 3:22
"Tell Me This Night Is Over" – 5:15
"Calleth You, Cometh I" (Ola Salo, Peter Kvint) – 4:32
"A Virgin like You" – 4:31
"Interlude" (Lars "Leari" Ljungberg) – 1:07
"Tired of Being an Object?" – 2:43
"Disease" – 3:16
"Vendelay" – 3:22
"2000 Light-Years of Darkness" – 7:02
"The Most Radical Thing to Do" – 4:11
The gap between the last two tracks contains a hidden instrumental, around a minute long string introduction to "The Most Radical Thing to Do"
Backing vocals by: Helena Josefsson, Gladys Del Pilar, Paris Gilbert, Pelle Ankarberg and Sara Isaksson

Personnel
The Ark are:
Ola Salo – Lead vocals, background vocals, piano, percussion and primary songwriting
Martin Axén – Rhythm Guitar and backing vocals
Mikael Jepson – Lead guitar
Leari Lars Ljungberg – Bass, and backing vocals
Sylvester Schlegel – drums and backing vocals

Charts

Weekly charts

Year-end charts

References

2002 albums
The Ark (Swedish band) albums
Virgin Records albums